The Murderer Lives at Number 21 is a 1942 French comedy thriller film by director Henri-Georges Clouzot. Adapted by Belgian writer Stanislas-André Steeman and Clouzot from Steeman's 1939 book of the same title, it was Clouzot's debut feature film as a director. The film is about the hunt by detective Wens (Pierre Fresnay) for the murderer Monsieur Durand, who leaves calling cards and manages to be everywhere at once. With the aspiring actress Mila Malou (Suzy Delair), Wens follows clues to a seedy boarding house where he hopes to find the murderer.

The Murderer Lives at Number 21 was the fourth film written by Clouzot for the Nazi run film company Continental Films who made films to take the place of banned American films. Clouzot made several changes from the script including the characters Mila and Wens from his previous screenplay for Le dernier des six (1941). The film was released in France to critical acclaim.

Plot
Inspector Wenceslas (referred to as "Wens" for short) Vorobeychik is assigned the case of a serial killer who leaves a calling card with the name 'Monsieur Durand' on his victims. Wens' mistress is the ditsy struggling actress Mila Malou who is determined to get noticed, and attempts to help Wens find the criminal. Wens discovers that Durand is a tenant at a boarding house at No. 21 Avenue Junot. Wens takes a room at the house in disguise as a Protestant minister. Suspects are arrested, but while each is in jail another Durand murder occurs. Both Mila and Wens discover who is responsible for the murders. Wens is captured, and as he is about to be killed Mila and the police arrive and rescue him.

Cast
 Suzy Delair as Mila Malou
 Pierre Fresnay as Wens
 Noël Roquevert as Dr. Linz
 Pierre Larquey as Colin
 Jean Tissier as Prof. Lalah Poor

Production
The Murderer Lives at Number 21 was the first feature film directed by Henri-Georges Clouzot and was the fourth screenplay he wrote for the Nazi-owned company Continental Films. The budget for the film was considered to be quite generous and included materials that were extravagant by pre-war standards. As American films were banned during the German occupation of France during World War II, Continental Films aimed at quality and commercial success in their pictures and produced films that were to take the place of the American films. The Murderer Lives at Number 21 is a thriller with light comedic elements, which was the style of most mystery films during the occupation.

Henri-Georges Clouzot was assisted by the story's original author Stanislas-André Steeman in writing the film. The film marked the second collaboration between the two, who both collaborated on The Last of the Six (1941) which was a previous screenplay by Clouzot and Steeman. Steeman was not happy with how Clouzot had handled either of the films. Clouzot made changes from the original story including changing the setting of the story from London to Paris. Clouzot also wrote in Wens and Mila Malou from Le Dernier des six to the script. Both Pierre Fresnay and Suzy Delair found Clouzot to be a demanding and even violent director. Delair recalled how Clouzot got his performance out of the actors, by stating that "He slapped me. So what? He slapped others as well...He was tough but I'm not about to complain". Fresnay recalled that Clouzot "worked relentlessly, which made for a juicy spectacle...That's to say nothing for his taste of violence, which he never tried with me".

Release
It was released in the United States in 1947.

On its initial release in France, The Murderer Lives at Number 21 was popular with critics and audiences. A reviewer from Le Miroir de l'Ecran noted the delighted reaction of the audience at the film's premiere, noting how "amusing and witty scenes alternate judiciously with more severe and dramatic ones" and that the film created a "clever cocktail of humor and drama". A reviewer from Ciné-mondial praised the directing of Clouzot, stating that he "has put the finishing touches on a production that is dense, concise, mobile, varied, all in the service of a rich imagination". In the United States, a reviewer for The New York Times wrote that "The Murderer Lives at Number 21, despite a wandering script that fails to tie up many loose ends, is good fun for whodunnit fans".

In 2013 the film received a DVD re-release from Eureka Entertainment as part of their Masters of Cinema series. Providing a 21st-century analysis, Bring The Noise UK reviewer Michael Dodd noted the "numerous brave little digs at the occupying Germans" present in the story. He particularly singled out a scene in which a criminal has his hands raised, only to have one arm lowered by Inspector Wens so that he may light a match on the man's neck, thus making the villain look as though he is performing a Nazi salute. "It is hard to believe that the strict German authorities missed the subtext of such a shot", he concluded "and the fact that he even dared to place it in the film at all is a testament to the character of Clouzot".

References
Notes

Bibliography
 Lloyd, Christopher. Henri-Georges Clouzot. Manchester University Press, 2007. .
 Mayne, Judith. French Film Guide: Le Corbeau. I.B.Tauris, 2007. .
 The New York Times Film Reviews, 1913–1968. The New York Times, 1993.
 Williams, Alan Larson. Republic of Images: A History of French Filmmaking. Harvard University Press, 1992. .

External links
 
 
 

1942 films
1940s French-language films
French black-and-white films
Films directed by Henri-Georges Clouzot
Films set in Paris
1940s mystery thriller films
1940s serial killer films
Police detective films
Films with screenplays by Henri-Georges Clouzot
Films based on Belgian novels
Films scored by Maurice Yvain
French mystery thriller films
French comedy thriller films
1942 comedy films
Continental Films films
1940s French films
Films based on works by Stanislas-André Steeman